Johnes is a surname. Notable people with the surname include:

Alexandra Johnes (born 1976), American film producer
Arthur James Johnes (1809–1871), English judge
Thomas Johnes (1748–1816), British politician
Geraint Johnes, English economist

See also
James Hills-Johnes (1833–1919), British soldier
Jones (surname)